Cheaper to Keep Her is a 1981 American comedy film directed by Ken Annakin, which starred singer-turned-actor Mac Davis alongside Tovah Feldshuh.

Plot 
William "Bill" Dekker (Davis) is a newly divorced swinger who goes to work for an attorney named K. D. Locke (Feldshuh) as an investigator. His assignments have him tracking down divorced men who have reneged on their alimony and child support payments, a twist of irony considering not only his chauvinistic tendencies, but also the fact that he himself is relying on the money he receives from his assignments to cover his own alimony payments. The film takes its title from the song of the same name, which can be heard over the opening credits.

Cast 
Mac Davis as Bill Dekker
Tovah Feldshuh as K.D. Locke
Bruce Flanders as Leon
Steven M. Gagnon as Peter
Gina Gallego as Sister #1
Jack Gilford as Stanley Bracken
Patrick Gorman as Maitre d'
Chuck Hicks as Abe
Gwen Humble as Laura
Gloria LeRoy as Woman on Diving Board
Priscilla Lopez as Theresa
Rose Marie as Ida Bracken
Ian McShane as Dr. Alfred Sunshine
Art Metrano as Tony Turino

Critical reception 
Critical reaction to the film has been overwhelmingly negative. Leonard Maltin rated it a BOMB, while the reviewing duo of Mick Martin and Marsha Porter labeled it a turkey. Gene Siskel, who registered the film for a "Dog of the Week" segment on PBS' Sneak Previews, called it "a pathetic comedy" with misleading advertising, adding:

References

External links
 
 

1981 films
1981 comedy films
American comedy films
Films directed by Ken Annakin
Regal Entertainment films
Films with screenplays by Timothy Harris (writer)
Films with screenplays by Herschel Weingrod
1980s English-language films
1980s American films